Korpin Hetki is the fifth EP by the black metal band Horna. It was released on Apocalyptic Empire Records in 2002, and was limited to 500 copies.

Track listing

Ikuisuuden Pimeyden Varjoihin 04:47
Condemned To Hell (Impaled Nazarene Cover) 03:19
Synkän Muiston Äärellä 05:04

External links
Metal Archives
Official Horna Site

2002 EPs
Horna EPs